Friedrich Otto Vogel (6 March 1925, Berlin – 5 August 2006, Heidelberg) was a German human geneticist. Together with Arno Motulsky he established in 1964 the journal Human Genetics, of which he remained editor-in-chief for more than 25 years. He was a member of the Heidelberger Akademie der Wissenschaften. In 1962, Vogel was named professor of human genetics and founding chair of the Institute of Anthropology and Human Genetics at Heidelberg University. Vogel became the leading German human geneticist and played a significant role in the rehabilitation of this field after the misuse of genetics by the Nazi regime (1932-1945).

Selected works

References

External links

1925 births
2006 deaths
German geneticists
Academic staff of Heidelberg University
Academic journal editors
Human geneticists
Free University of Berlin alumni
Officers Crosses of the Order of Merit of the Federal Republic of Germany